Red Hot + Bothered (also known as  Red Hot + Bothered: The Indie Rock Guide Book to Dating) is an anthology of the indie rock scene from the 1990s produced by Paul Heck. It was released as part of the Red Hot AIDS Benefit Series.

The recording initially appeared as a pair of 10" EP recordings bundled with limited edition fanzines, and spoofing dating guides. Also included was advice from well-known artists and freelancing writers aimed at reaching the jaded youth in the audience on a variety of issues; these include relationships, love, sex and the impact of AIDS on such matters.

The EP recordings were eventually followed-up by a full–length CD which included several tracks absent on the vinyl EP's.

Track listing
"Sensational Gravity Boy" performed by Freedom Cruise
"Still Flat" performed by Built to Spill + Caustic Resin
"The Mirror Is Gone" performed by Lisa Germano
"Mouthwash" performed by Noise Addict
"Indierockinstrumental" performed by Folk Implosion
"Some Fantasy" performed by The Verlaines
"Little League" performed by Liquorice
"Hazmats" performed by Babe The Blue Ox *
"Mainland China" performed by Juicy *
"The Fontana" performed by The Sea and Cake *
"Sotto Voce" performed by Cradle Robbers
"Rex's Blues" performed by Jay Farrar + Kelly Willis
"Empty Yard" performed by Grifters
"Miracleland" performed by East River Pipe
"Snail Trail" performed by Heavenly *
"Hopeless" performed by Future Bible Heroes *
"Servicing Man" performed by Flying Nuns *
"Quietly Approaching" performed by Gastr Del Sol *

* Tracks only available on CD release.

See also
Red Hot Organization

Red Hot Organization albums
1995 compilation albums
Indie rock compilation albums